Quadrio is a multifunctional complex in the centre of Prague, Czech Republic, at metro station Národní třída. It serves mainly as shopping centre and it is also containing offices and residential building. It is also connected with Shopping house Máj, which was built in 1975. Construction of Quadrio complex took place between 2012 and 2014. The building has three underground and eight above-ground floors. Investor of the project was European real estate investor CPI Property Group. It was designer by Czech architectonic atelier Jakub Cigler Architects.

The kinetic sculpture Head of Franz Kafka by David Černý is located next to the complex.

References

External links 

 Official website

Commercial buildings completed in 2014
Office buildings completed in 2014
Shopping malls in Prague
New Town, Prague
2014 establishments in the Czech Republic
Shopping malls established in 2014
21st-century architecture in the Czech Republic